Mehdiabad-e Jalaleh (also Romanized as Mehdīābād-e Jalāleh; also known as Mehdīābād) is a village in Sadat Mahmudi Rural District, Pataveh District, Dana County, Kohgiluyeh and Boyer-Ahmad Province, Iran. At the 2006 census, its population was 357, in 50 families.

References 

Populated places in Dana County